Margaret Garcia (born September 20, 1951) is a Chicana muralist, educator, and arts-advocate based in Los Angeles.

Early life and education
Margaret Garcia was born in 1951 at the County/USC Hospital in East Los Angeles, and is descended from the Tarahumara indigenous people of Mexico. At the age of ten, Garcia started painting portraits of family members, and of the local Latino community. She studied arts in college, and in 1978, she became involved with the Citywide Mural Program.

Garcia studied art at the Los Angeles City College, California State University, Northridge, and the University of Southern California where she received her Master of Fine Arts degree in 1992.

Career and artworks 
Garcia is a prolific painter (primarily of portraits) and has painted several murals in the greater Los Angeles area. She has taught courses and workshops on painting, and has lectured extensively in the region. In 2000, she was commissioned by the Los Angeles County Metro Art program to create a mural for the subway stop at the University City/Studio City location. Currently, Garcia teaches at Plaza De La Raza in Los Angeles, California, and curates art exhibitions.

"Finding Jesus at the Taco Stand" 
2009, 10 x 13 in., oil on canvas, University of Wyoming Art Museum, Laramie, Wyoming

Part of the Cheech Marin Collection, this painting is a reflection of the predominantly Chicano neighborhood that Garcia grew up with in Boyle Heights. It is also featured in the artbook collection of small paintings entitled "Chicanitas from the Cheech Marin Collection."

"Two Blue Whales" 
1992, 17' X 63' ft, Acrylic, Venice Blvd., Los Angeles, CA

Inspired by a news story about Blue Whales being hunted to extinction, Garcia created a mural featuring two Blue Whales playing in the ocean.  The sixty-foot mural is painted on a wall between Beethoven St. and Venice Blvd. in Mar Vista.

"Tree of Califas" 
2000, Mural, Universal City Station, L.A. Metro Rail, Los Angeles, CA

The mural presents tourists and residents with information about an historic event that took place on the land adjacent to the metro station. At this historic site, California was ceded to the United States from Mexico. The state was named after the fictional queen Calafia, and the artwork is designed to evoke the mature pepper trees that used to grow along nearby Lankershim Boulevard.

Exhibitions

Solo exhibitions 

 "Viision of Phantasmagoria", May 2009, Freemont Art Gallery, Pasadena, CA
"Home Again: Margaret Garcia's Return", Aug.-Sept. 2016, Medical Village Gallery, USC County Medical Center, Los Angeles, CA
 "Arte Para La Gente", Oct. 2020-Jan. 2021, Museum of Ventura County, Ventura County, CA

Group exhibitions 

 "Chicano Visions: American Painters on the Verge", June-Sept. 2005, Mexican Fine Arts Center Museum Main Gallery and Torres Gallery, National Museum of Mexican Art, Chicago, IL
 "Adelante! Mexican American Artists: 1960's and Beyond", Sept. 2011-Jan. 2012 Forest Lawn Museum, Glendale, CA
"Today Is The Shadow Of Tomorrow: Día De Los Muertos 2015 Exhibition", Oct.-Nov. 2015, SOMArts Cultural Center, San Francisco, CA
 "Prayer Pieces", Dec. 2015, Casa 0101, Los Angeles, CA
"Born In The Heart", May 2016, ChimMaya Art Gallery, Los Angeles, CA
"Defining Ourselves: A Matriarchy of Artists" Oct. 2016, The Muckenthaler Cultural Center, Fullerton, CA
 "Papel Chicano Dos: Works on Paper from the Collection of Cheech Marin", Feb.-May 2017, Riverside Art Museum, Riverside, CA
 "LA/LA/LA", Sept.-Oct. 2017, Robert Berman Gallery, Santa Monica, CA
 "Summer in the City", Jul.-Aug. 2017, Avenue 50 Studio, Los Angeles, CA
 Atzlan: A Sense of Place", Oct. 2017-Jan. 2018, The dA Center for the Arts, Pomona, CA
 "Lowrider: A Group Show", Apr.-May 2018, Avenue 50 Studio, Los Angeles, CA
"Black, Brown and Beige", Aug.-Sep. 2019, The Self Help Graphics & Art, Los Angeles, CA
"Ascending In Power And Significance: Women On The Rise", March 2020, Vita Art Center, Ventura, CA

Collections 
Margaret Garcia's artworks can be found in the permanent collections of several major museums including, the Cheech Marin Center for Chicano Art, Los Angeles County Museum of Art, The Museum of Ventura County, La Salle University Art Museum, Laguna Art Museum, Blanton Museum of Art, The Roswell Museum and Art Center, Fine Arts Museums of San Francisco, Forest Lawn Museum of Glendale, the Riverside Art Museum, the Musée d'Aquitaine and the University of Wyoming Art Museum.

Honors and awards 
 1993 William Comfort Tiffany Foundation Award
 Feitelson/Lundberg Award
Honored at the 13th Annual Aztlan exhibition "Aztlan Mujeres de Aztlan/Desde el corazon de la mujer (From The Hearts of Women)"  at the dA Center for the Arts in Pomona from Oct 9-Nov 21, 2015.

References 

American women painters
American artists of Mexican descent
California State University, Northridge alumni
University of Southern California alumni
Artists from Los Angeles
1951 births
Living people
21st-century American women